In da Loop (lit. In The Loop) is a Philippine late-night reality series on Cge TV that debuted from April 23, 2012 to October 26, 2012. Aired on ABS-CBN weeknights at 12:30 am before sign-off.

Hosts

CgeTV Jocks
SEASON 1
Jobert Austria
Chacha Balba
Edu Ibazeta
Anna Tan
Nikko Ramos
Jessica Mendoza
Marc McMahon

SEASON 2
Jobert Austria
Chacha Balba
Edu Ibazeta
Anna Tan
Karen Dematera
Janeena Chan
Jaz Reyes
Terence Lloyd
Marc McMahon
DJ Bane Tulfo

CgeTV SuperChannels
Christian Bautista
K Brosas
Coach Rio Dela Cruz
Jhai'ho
Anna Tan
DJ Chacha

Segments
Ahhh - Mature!
Angst TV
Antic Shop
Awesome!
CgeTV In Da Net
Cgeparazzi
Cgezen On the Go!
Cge U
Cute!
Dear Ate Chacha
Dine Hard
How 2D2
Lifecast
Like A Sikat
Male Room
Master Bati
Press Play
Reporting for Beauty
Somewhere Out Dare
Sample! Sample!
Ur The Star
Usapang Lalaki
What the tech!
Welcome to CgeTV

See also
 List of programs broadcast by ABS-CBN
 List of programs aired by ABS-CBN
 CgeTV

References

External links
 Cge.TV

ABS-CBN original programming
Philippine reality television series
2012 Philippine television series debuts
2012 Philippine television series endings
Filipino-language television shows